The Chrysler TEVan was a battery electric vehicle produced from 1993 to 1995 by Chrysler and sold primarily to electric utilities throughout the United States. The first generation used either nickel-iron or nickel-cadmium batteries. Only 56 were produced and were sold for approximately $120,000 each. Half were produced using nickel-iron batteries and half were equipped with the nickel-cadmium packs. The TEVan was built on the same production line as the gasoline-powered minivans at Chrysler's Windsor Assembly Plant in Ontario, Canada. The second generation, named the EPIC (Electric Powered Interurban Commuter Vehicle), was launched in 1997 with advanced lead acid batteries and later in 1998 with nickel metal-hydride batteries. It was offered for lease in New York and California in 1999.

Batteries
The TEVan owner's manual stated  of range.

Charger
The TEVan's on-board charger was a PFC Martin-Marietta and accepted 120 VAC@20A or 40A, 240 VAC@20A or 40A, and as high as 220 VAC@40A- three-phase inputs.

Powertrain
The TEVan used a 27 hp, 65 hp max (48 kW) Separately-Excited GE DC traction motor coupled to a two-speed FWD trans-axle that featured Hi, Lo, Reverse and Park. The owner's manual referred to it as a 'semi-automatic transmission' although it used a clutch. The motor controller was also manufactured by GE. The EPIC used an AC traction motor and single speed transmissions.

Accessories
The TEVan had an 8.8 kW three-stage ceramic electric heater. The 120A DC/DC converter provided all the 12v power, there was no auxiliary (12V) battery. Gauges included motor temperature and SOC (state of charge, akin to "Fuel Level") using the stock instruments. It was also equipped with electric air conditioning (R-134a), regenerative braking, power brakes using a Delco electric vacuum pump, power steering, AM/FM Stereo, and airbags. The original equipment tires were LRR, (Low Rolling Resistance), Goodyear P205/75R15 Momentum at 50PSI.

External links
Dave Davidson's '93 Dodge TEVan - evalbum
Don Buckshot's '93 Dodge TEVan - evalbum
James Wolfe's '93 Dodge TEVan - evalbum
electricdrive.org article
electricdrive.org pdf

Electric cars
TEVan
CARB's ZEV Mandate
Cars introduced in 1993